Francine "Frankie" McCoy (born 30 April 1969) is an American singer who lives in Europe. She gained much popularity as the vocalist on Sash!'s number one Billboard Hot Dance Music/Club Play track from 1997, "Stay". La Trec is the former stage name she used at the time of her Sash! collaborations.

McCoy was born in Germany, where her father, who was in the US Army, was stationed. Shortly after her birth, the young family moved back to San Francisco in the United States, where she grew up. After a couple of years, her mother started working for the United Nations, which often forced the family to move to different places.

McCoy was already the singer of a dance-track called "Push Me to the Limit" by Celvin Rotane in 1995 and "Love Is My Whole World" by 4Tune in 1996. A year later she did vocals for a commercial in the studio of Ralf Kappmeier, one of Sash's producers, who asked her to sing on their forthcoming album It's My Life. As La Trec she sang and co-wrote the album tracks "Sweat", "Hoopstar" and the hit "Stay". The name La Trec was derived from a character in a book.

In the late 1990s, she moved to The Hague in the Netherlands to live with her boyfriend. She started focusing on soul and R&B music, and performs throughout Western Europe under the stage name "Urban Daughter" with her band, with whom she is also working on a new album.

She is the founder of and active in UDBAM (an acronym for "Urban Daughter Big Ass Music"), a musical event organization and artist agency.

She has three brothers, Tyron N McCoy Jr., Cyrus A McCoy, and Byron P McCoy. In early 2013 she was also featured on episode 22 of Hard with Style. The track is called "Lose Control", her collaboration with Scantraxx's Wildstylez & Max Enforcer.

See also
List of number-one dance hits (United States)
List of artists who reached number one on the US Dance chart

References

Living people
American dance musicians
American house musicians
1969 births